Dahigaon Korhale is a village in Rahata taluka of Ahmednagar district in the Indian state of Maharashtra. It is located near Rahata city.

Population
As per 2011 census, population of village is 2077, of which 1096 are males and 981 are females.

Transport

Road
Dahigaon Korhale is connected to nearby villages by village roads. Ahmednagar-Manmad State highway passes near from village.

Rail
Shirdi Railway Station is nearest railway station to a village.

Air
Shirdi Airport is located at distance of 9 km from a village.

See also
List of villages in Rahata taluka

References 

Villages in Ahmednagar district